Asmara Gay (born 1975) is a Mexican writer and translator. She is the editor of the magazine El Comité 1973 and member of the literary group "El Comité". In 2018 she was appointed Ambassador of the Spanish Language by the César Egido Serrano Foundation and the Museum of the Word.

Biography 
Gay has a Master's degree in literary creation by the Centro de Cultura Casa Lamm. Nowadays she teaches literature in Casa Lamm. Gay studied her bachelor in the UNAM.

For more than two decades Gay has published several articles, essays and poems in different magazines from Mexico and Spain. In 2014 Gay published the study "Las teorías del cuento y sus contradicciones"

El Comité 
In the year 2014, Gay was invited by Meneses Monroy to join to the literary group El Comité. First as a collaborator of the magazine El Comité 1973 and then as the editor of the magazine. In 2017 the group celebrated its fifth anniversary and Asmara Gay was part of the celebration that took place in the Centro Cultural del México Contemporáneo.

Works 
 Elena se mira en el espejo, 2011, Gay, Asmara. México, D. F.: Editorial Grupo Destiempos.
 Homenaje a Juan García Ponce : Imagen primera y La noche : cincuenta años después, 2015, Vv aa. Coordinación y presentación de Magda Díaz y Morales. México, D. F.: Instituto Veracruzano de la Cultura (Voladores).
 El ensayo: fundamentos y ejercicios, 2018, Gay, Asmara. Ciudad de México: Fundación Universitaria de Derecho y Administración Política.
 Asmara Gay is also the Director of the recognized Revista Hispanoamericana de Literatura (Hispanoamerican Literature Review), edited by IJ Editores.

References

External links 
 Ser parte de El Comité 1973
 Edgar Allan Poe. El arte del cuento y los inicios del cuento moderno
Nunca me hizo caso... Hasta que despertó ardiendo.
¿Con ensayo o Contra ensayo?

Mexican writers
Mexican poets
Mexican artists
Translators to Spanish
1975 births
Living people
Mexican essayists